Me is the sixth and last album by London indie pop band Biff Bang Pow! released in 1991.<ref name="Discogs.com">[http://www.discogs.com/Biff-Bang-Pow-Me/release/1024830 Biff Bang Pow! on Discogs.com]</ref>

Track listing
Side AMy First Friend - (01:47)Miss You - (04:48)I'm Burned - (03:01)Song For A Nail - (03:00)She Saved Me - (02:10)
Side BYou Just Can't Buy Satisfaction - (02:56)Sad Eyes In Velvet - (02:39)Guilt Ridden - (01:30)Lovers - (03:04)Baby You Just Make Me Strong'' - (04:25)

Personnel
Robert Young - guitar
Richard Green - guitar, acoustic guitar
Edward Ball - organ, vocals
Ken Popple - percussion, vocals
Joss Cope - synthesizer
Paul Mulreany - vocals
Alan McGee - vocals, acoustic guitar, organ

References

1991 albums
Biff Bang Pow! albums